Ghulam Akbar Lasi (Urdu: ‎; d. 7 November 2017, Karachi) was a Pakistani politician and member of National Assembly of Pakistan who served as deputy minister of labor during Benazir Bhutto cabinet. He served as vice-president of Pakistan People's Party Balochistan.

Political career 
Ghulam Akbar Lasi was born in village of outskirts of the historic town of Bela in the Lasbela district of Balochistan. He did his master's degree from Karachi University.

Lasi was elected to the National Assembly of Pakistan in 1988 Pakistani general election from NA-272. Later he joined Pakistan Peoples Party due to issue with Jam Mohammad Yousaf.

He was re-elected to the National Assembly of Pakistan as a candidate of Pakistan Tehreek-e-Insaf (PPP) on from NA-272 (Lasbela-cum-Gwadar) in 1993 Pakistani general election.

Ghulam Akbar Lasi died on 7 November 2017 in Karachi.

References 

2017 deaths
People from Karachi
Pakistani MNAs 1988–1990
Pakistani MNAs 1993–1996
Federal ministers of Pakistan